Vaibhavwadi taluka is a taluka in Kankavli subdivision of Sindhudurg district in the Indian state of Maharashtra.

It was earlier a small market town by the name Vabhwe. In the early 1980s it was accorded the status of tehsil under the new district Sindhudurg. Located to the north-east of Kankavali, Vaibhavwadi is off National Highway 66 (Old National Highway 17) and is on the district's eastern border with Kolhapur District. Nandgaon is 22 km south.

A strong influence of Kolhapuri and Konkani civilizations is prevalent in the area. The prime attraction here is some ancient caves at Ainari Village amid dense forest and mountains. Dating back to the period of the Samrat Ashoka, these caves are noted for their magnificent carvings.

Vaibhavwadi Road Railway Station, managed by the Konkan Railways, serves the area.

Here in terms of tourism see Napne waterfall as well as Dr. Babasaheb Ambedkar Memorial is located at Vaibhavwadi.
Here you can see Dr. Babasaheb Ambedkar Memorial building along with Golden Pagoda, Dragon Pagoda and Panchshil Garden at Post Taluka Vaibhavwadi, dist Sindhudurg, Maharashtra State, India.

Climate
Vaibhavwadi has a semi-tropical climate and remains warm and humid in most of the year. It has three clear seasons: rainy (June-October), winter (November-mid February) and summer (mid February–May). Monsoon winds bring heavy rains, with an average rainfall of 3240.10 mm.  

The major crops are rice, mango, cashew, coconut, vari, nachani, groundnut, jackfruit, beetlenut and spices.

Cuisine
The cuisine of the Vaibhavwadi is popularly known as Malvani cuisine. Coconut, rice and fish assume prime significance. Kombdi vade, a chicken savoury, is the most popular dish here. Others include ukadya tandulachi pej (उकड्या तांदळाची पेज - a semi-fluid boiled preparation made of brown-red rice) and sol kadhi (सोल कढी - a preparation made of sol (kokum) सोल and coconut milk).

Mango is a major factor in the life of Sindhudurg. Varieties of Alphonso mango (हापुस आंबा ) from Devgad are particularly popular. Other varieties of mango are Mankur (मानकुर), Pāyari (पायरी) and Karel (करेल - used for preparing mango pickles) are also popular for their distinct taste.

Malvani cuisine also has many vegetarian dishes, including garyache sandan, pickle of karmal, bimble, amba halad, karadichi bhakri, kanyacha sanja, appe, ghavan, dalimichi usual, and kaju usual.

Tourism

Tourist sites in the area include:

 Radhanagri Wildlife Sanctuary: The first wildlife sanctuary of Maharashtra was notified in 1958. It spreads over 351 km2 and is a south tropical semi-evergreen forest. It lies at the southern end of the Sahyadri sub-cluster and is popularly known as Bison Sanctuary, as the Indian bison or gaur (Bos gaurus) is the flagship species of the area. Other animals sheltered in the sanctuary include leopard, sloth bear, wild boar, barking deer, mouse deer, sambar, giant squirrel and wild dogs.

 Napne waterfall: Located at Sherpe village in Vaibhavwadi taluka, this waterfall is known as Swimmer's Delight, and is a safe swimming spot. The area around the waterfall is also a natural habitat for rare species of birds, especially the hornbills.
 Shivgad fort: Located at Ghonsari, Phondaghat, this fort attracts tourists and mountaineers. Since the terrain and peaks of this region contain Asia's largest known biodiversity for flora and fauna, Dajipur Bison Sanctuary, the view of the area surrounding the fort is an attraction here. Kasarde Salva mountains Gagangad are visible from this fort. Goddess Bhavanimata's Temple of remains of some imposing structures. Cannons are also seen inside the fort but to see all this, one has to trek to the top.
 Gagangad: Gagangad is 59 km from Kankawali, and was erected by Raja Bhoj in the 12th century. It is constructed on the table top of Gaganbavda, 3000 feet above sea level. It is constructed only on one rock and has only one narrow entrance. It is famous since Nnatha Sampraday Gagangiri Maharaj stayed here. He is known throughout India as a social worker.
 Aakhavane-Bhom : Aakhavane-Bhom is a forest near Vaibhawadi known for groups of wolves expert in the skill of hunting.
 Mounde: This is a  small village surrounded by the range of Sahyadri Parvat. This village is located on the borders of three districts, Kolhapur, Ratnagiri and Sindhudurg. This village is around 35 km from Vaibhavwadi. From Sahyadri vales can be seen many waterfalls. The Aruna River is raised from Manmoda Parvat.

 Vyaghreshwar Waterfall: Vyaghreshwar waterfall at Manche, which descends from 300 feet height, is out of sight for a long time.
 Aianari caves: Vaibhawadi is 39 km from Kankawali Aianari caves. These caves are 8 km from village Bhuibavda in Sahyadri range. Springs flow continuously in the cave. One can see five kundas as Pandavekundas. There is a local belief that Bhima, the pandav, killed Bakasur in the forest nearby.
 Karul Ghat: This is the most important link between Sindhudurg and Kolhapur district, nearly 10 km in length. It is the coolest place and also known for Gagangiri maharaj math. It is nearly 1000 feet tall. From that place one can view Sahyadri range up to 10 layers.

Beaches nearby
 Redi - 112 km
 Shiroda - 112 km
 Tarkarli - 84 km
 Malvan - 79.5 km
 Vijaydurg - 68 km
 Velagar - 106 km
 Bhogve - 94 km
 Nivti - 89 km
 Khavne - 88 km
 Devbaug - 89 km
 Wayaangani - 88 km
 Achara - 70 km
 Mochemad - 106 km
 Mithbaon - 64.5 km
 Sagaareshwar (Ubhadanda) - 98 km
 Chivla - 74 km
 Baagayat - 106 km
 Mithmumbari - 61.4 km

Sindhudurg guide 
Sindhudurg Tour Guide Pvt Ltd is an initiative launched to boost tourism in Sindhudurg district. The organization trains youth from local communities to take various self-employment opportunities in the tourism industry. These trainees are later motivated to run businesses like tourist guides, tour operators, travel agency, rental cars, home stays, agrotourism, water sports and village tourism.

Folk arts

In Indian mythology the ten incarnations of Lord Vishnu are collectively known as Dashavatara. To preserve the universe from destruction Vishnu took ten different forms (avatars) from time to time. They are Matsya (fish), Katchha (turtle), Varaha (boar), Narsimha (half man, half lion), Waman (a Brahman boy), Purshuram, Rama, Krishna, Buddha, and Kalki.

In Sindhudurg Dashavatar is the most popular art form. Dance ritual dramas are held in most of the temples during festive occasions. Interesting characters in these dramas are Apsaras (heavenly maidens), whose roles are played by men in women's attire.

There are nine original Dashavatara performing groups in Sindhudurg, and Walawalkar group is believed to be the first. Credit also goes to the pioneer Shymnaikji kale who introduced Dashavatar to Sindhudurg in the 11th century. The, same Dashavatar is today known as Adivere Dashavatar in which ten incarnations of Lord Vishnu are presented one after the other on the stage.

Location and access

Road
Vaibhavwadi is easily accessible by road and railway. By road, Vaibhavwadi is 543 km away from Mumbai, and 112 km from Ratnagiri. When arriving from Mumbai or Goa, take National Highway NH-66 (Old NH 17) until Talere and then take a State Transport bus or rickshaw for an approximately 35 km ride to Vaibhavwadi.

Railways
Vaibhavwadi station lies on the Konkan Railway. Nearly every train running on Konkan Railway has a stop at Vaibhavwadi Station.

See also
Kusur, Vaibhavwadi

References

Cities and towns in Sindhudurg district
Talukas in Maharashtra
Talukas in Sindhudurg district